Denise Page Hood (born February 21, 1952) is a senior United States district judge of the United States District Court for the Eastern District of Michigan.

Education and career

Born in Columbus, Ohio, Hood received a Bachelor of Arts from Yale University in 1974 and a Juris Doctor from Columbia Law School in 1977. She was assistant corporation counsel to the Law Department of the City of Detroit, Michigan, from 1977 to 1982. She then held several state judicial positions, first on the 36th District Court of Michigan from 1983 to 1989, then on the Recorder's Court of the City of Detroit from 1989 to 1992, and lastly on the Michigan Circuit Court for Wayne County, Michigan, from 1993 to 1994.

Federal judicial service

On March 9, 1994, Hood was nominated by President Bill Clinton to a seat on the United States District Court for the Eastern District of Michigan vacated by George E. Woods. She was confirmed by the United States Senate on June 15, 1994, and received her commission on June 16, 1994. She became Chief Judge on December 31, 2015. and served in that role until February 15, 2022. She assumed senior status on May 1, 2022.

See also 
 List of African-American federal judges
 List of African-American jurists

References

External links

1952 births
Living people
20th-century American judges
20th-century American women judges
21st-century American judges
21st-century American women judges
African-American judges
Columbia Law School alumni
Judges of the United States District Court for the Eastern District of Michigan
Michigan state court judges
Lawyers from Columbus, Ohio
United States district court judges appointed by Bill Clinton
Yale University alumni